The men's doubles competition for bowling at the 2019 Southeast Asian Games in Philippines was held on 4 December 2019 at Coronado Lanes, Starmall EDSA-Shaw.

Results 
Detailed result as in below:

References 

Men's doubles